Ostreobiaceae are a family of green algae in the order Bryopsidales.

References

Ulvophyceae families
Bryopsidales
Monogeneric algae families